A total solar eclipse occurred on September 7, 1858. A solar eclipse occurs when the Moon passes between Earth and the Sun, thereby totally or partly obscuring the image of the Sun for a viewer on Earth. A total solar eclipse occurs when the Moon's apparent diameter is larger than the Sun's, blocking all direct sunlight, turning day into darkness. Totality occurs in a narrow path across Earth's surface, with the partial solar eclipse visible over a surrounding region thousands of kilometres wide.
It was visible across South America.

Observations
Emmanuel Liais from Brazil

Related eclipses

Saros series 142

Notes

References
 NASA graphic
 Googlemap
 NASA Besselian elements
 An Account of the Total Eclipse of the Sun on September 7, 1858, as Observed Near Olmos, Peru by Lieut. J. M. Gillis, Published by the Smithsonian Institution, Washington, Smithsonian Contributions to Knowledge, vol. 11, April 1859
 

1858 09 07
1858 in science
1858 09 07
September 1858 events